Urvillea is a plant genus in the family Sapindaceae.

References

External links

Sapindaceae genera
Sapindaceae